Frank Appleby may refer to:

 Frank Pierpoint Appleby (1913–2015), provincial level politician from Alberta, Canada
 T. Frank Appleby (1864–1924), American Republican Party politician who represented New Jersey's 3rd congressional district